The Aero Adventure Pegasus is a small civil utility aircraft  under development in the United States for sale as a kitplane. Of conventional monoplane configuration and composite construction, the Pegasus will seat its pilot and passenger in tandem and be available with a choice of two different wings, a longer wing for extended range, and a shorter wing for increased maneuverability.

Specifications (as designed, long wing)

See also

Homebuilt aircraft
2000s United States civil utility aircraft
Pegasus